Echo Canyon may refer to:

Places in the American West
 Echo Canyon State Park, a state park in Nevada
 Echo Canyon Reservoir State Wildlife Area, a fishing and birding area in Colorado
 Camelback Mountain, Echo Canyon Recreation Area, a park in Phoenix, Arizona
 A canyon in Chiricahua National Monument, Arizona
 A canyon in Death Valley, California
 A canyon in Summit County, Utah
 A canyon in Zion National Park, Utah

 Echo Park (Colorado), an area in Dinosaur National Monument
 Echo Park Dam, a proposed dam in Echo Park that was never built

Music related
 The New York City studio of the band Sonic Youth, and "Bad Moon Rising" by that band
 Echo Canyon West, the Hoboken, New Jersey, studio of the same band that replaced the aforementioned studio
 An album by jazz flautist James Newton
 A song by folk musician Rosalie Sorrels

Various
 A one-minute short of the television cartoon The Simpsons